Sputnik Monthly Digest (1967–1991), "a monthly digest of the best of current Soviet writing", was the flagship English publication of the Soviet-era Novosti Press Agency. It was the English language edition of Sputnik.

The Summer issue (June, July, August) of 1971 published Mikhail Sagatelyan's theory of the John F. Kennedy assassination as a right-wing conspiracy to prolong the Cold War.

References

1967 establishments in the Soviet Union
1991 disestablishments in the Soviet Union
Magazines published in the Soviet Union
Magazines established in 1967
Magazines disestablished in 1991